Odinia is a genus of flies in the family Odiniidae. There are more than 20 described species in Odinia.

Species
These 27 species belong to the genus Odinia:

 Odinia betulae Sabrosky, 1959
 Odinia biguttata Sabrosky, 1959
 Odinia boletina (Zetterstedt, 1848)
 Odinia brevitibia Shewell, 1960
 Odinia connecta Cogan, 1975
 Odinia conspicua Sabrosky, 1959
 Odinia coronata Sabrosky, 1959
 Odinia czernyi Collin, 1952
 Odinia foliata Krivosheina, 1979
 Odinia formosipennis Frey, 1961
 Odinia hendeli Collin, 1952
 Odinia loewi Collin, 1952
 Odinia maculata Meigen, 1830
 Odinia meijerei Collin, 1952
 Odinia ornata Zetterstedt, 1838
 Odinia parvipunctata Sabrosky, 1959
 Odinia peleterii (Robineau-Desvoidy, 1830)
 Odinia penrithorum Cogan, 1975
 Odinia photophila Papp, 1977
 Odinia picta (Loew, 1861)
 Odinia pomona Cogan, 1969
 Odinia rossi MacGowan & Rotheray, 2004
 Odinia surumuana Prado, 1973
 Odinia thaii Papp, 2006
 Odinia trifida Carles-Tolra, 1996
 Odinia williamsi Johnson, 1924
 Odinia xanthocera Collin, 1952

References

Further reading

External links

 

Odiniidae
Articles created by Qbugbot
Opomyzoidea genera